Cyamites or Kyamites from κύαμος "bean", was a hero in ancient Greek religion, worshiped locally in Athens.

His name has been interpreted as "the god of the beans and patron of the bean market", given that a bean market (κυαμῖτις) was reported by Plutarch to have been situated on the same road not far from the sanctuary.

Kyamites was probably a name for Hadês.

Notes

References
 Realencyclopädie der Classischen Altertumswissenschaft, Band XI, Halbband 22, Komogrammateus-Kynegoi  (1922), s. 2233 (German)

Demigods in classical mythology
Religion in ancient Athens